The Slovakia national handball team is the national handball team of Slovakia. It takes part in international team handball competitions. It was established in 1993 by the disintegration of the Czechoslovak team, of which it is the successor.

Competitive record

World Championship

European Championship

Team

Current squad

Player statistics

Most capped players

Top scorers

See also
 Slovakia women's national handball team

References

External links

IHF profile

Handball in Slovakia
Men's national handball teams
National sports teams of Slovakia